Vitali Borisovich Kulyov (born 20 January 1976) is a Russian professional football coach and a former player. He is the assistant coach of FC Torpedo-2.

Club career
He made his professional debut in the Russian First Division in 1994 for FC Tekhinvest-M Moskovsky. He played 3 games in the UEFA Intertoto Cup 1997 for FC Dynamo Moscow.

Honours
 Russian Premier League bronze: 1997.
 Russian Cup finalist: 1997.

References

1976 births
Footballers from Moscow
Living people
Russian footballers
Association football midfielders
FC Dynamo Moscow players
Russian Premier League players
FC Fakel Voronezh players
FC Akhmat Grozny players
FC Khimki players
FC Volgar Astrakhan players
FC Kristall Smolensk players
FC Dynamo Saint Petersburg players
Russian football managers